"Please, Please, Please" is a 1956 song by James Brown & the Famous Flames.

Please, Please, Please may also refer to:
Please Please Please (album), an album by James Brown
Please, Please, Please, a song by Fiona Apple from Extraordinary Machine

See also
"Please, Please", a song by McFly
Please (disambiguation)